Nick Trenkel (born 7 April 1987 in Canada) was a Canadian rugby union player. His playing position was centre. He was named in the Canada squad for the 2007 Rugby World Cup, making his one and only international appearance in the tournament. His match came against Australia, coming on as a replacement. Following the World Cup, he joined French side Narbonne making one appearance.

Reference list

External links
itsrugby.co.uk profile

1987 births
Canadian rugby union players
Canada international rugby union players
Living people
Rugby union centres